The Tin Hau Temple in Causeway Bay is one of the Tin Hau temples in Hong Kong. It is located at 10 Tin Hau Temple Road, Causeway Bay, east of Victoria Park, in Eastern District, on Hong Kong Island. The temple has given its name to the MTR station serving it (Island line), and consequently the neighboring area of Tin Hau.

History
The original temple dates back to 1747 (the date of the temple bell) and was built by members of the Tai family, a family of Hakkas from Guangdong, who first settled in Kowloon. Legend has it, the family used to travel by boat to Causeway Bay to gather grass and discovered an incense burner found floating miraculously on the sea. This incident gave rise to one of the pre-colonial names for Hong Kong Island, Hung Heung Lo (Red Incense-burner island).

The present building dates back to 1868 and despite renovations, is still largely in its original form. It is now located inland as a consequence of land reclamation, originally being on the waterfront.

Architecture and layout 
The temple is famous for the fine Shek Wan figurines on its roof and eaves, and the quality of its stone carvings around the entrance. Inside the temple, the main altar and several side altars are dedicated to Tin Hau, Goddess of the Sea and patron "saint" of seafarers.

Additional side altars dedicated to Tsoi San, the God of Wealth, and Kwun Yum, the Goddess of childbirth. Finally there are side altars to the black-faced Pau Kung, the Lenient Judge of the Underworld. He is worshipped in the hope that he will be merciful to the souls in his care.

Conservation
The Tin Hau Temple in Causeway Bay became a declared monument in 1982.

References

External links

 Antiquities and Monuments Office: "Renovation Project for Tin Hau Temple in Causeway Bay". September 2003
 
The Temple Trail Tin Hau Temple Causeway Bay 2015

Tin Hau temples in Hong Kong
Tin Hau, Hong Kong
Declared monuments of Hong Kong